, abbreviated as C.N.N, is a Japanese pop duo that debuted in 1997 with their single The Power of Love, that was used as an opening theme of the anime Master of Mosquiton and followed by Good Vibration also used as a second opening theme in the series.

Members
  as Professor H – Producer
  as Sister MAYO – Vocals

Discography

Singles

Albums

References

External links
 Official Site
 Sister MAYO

Japanese pop music groups
Japanese rock music groups
Nippon Columbia artists
Musical groups established in 1997
Musical groups disestablished in 2000
Anime musical groups